Larry Noble (born 13 December 1914 in Huddersfield, West Riding of Yorkshire) was a stage comedian and actor best known for starring in the Whitehall farces with Brian Rix. He starred in the original production of Reluctant Heroes and as the chirpy French jockey in Dry Rot. On television, he made guest appearances on Last of the Summer Wine in 1975 and Blake's 7 in 1981. He died on 9 September 1993, aged 78.

Selected filmography
 Not Wanted on Voyage (1957)

References

External links
 

English male stage actors
1993 deaths
English male comedians
1914 births
20th-century English comedians
Male actors from Huddersfield